is a train station in the city of Fuji, Shizuoka Prefecture, Japan  operated by Central Japan Railway Company (JR Tōkai).

Lines

Station layout
Fujikawa Station has a single side platform serving Track 1 and an island platform serving Track 2 and Track 3, connected to the station building by a footbridge. Track 2 is used for through transit of express trains. The station is staffed.

Platforms

Adjacent stations

|-
!colspan=5|Central Japan Railway Company

Station history
The initial plan for the Tōkaidō Main Line was to construct stations in accord with the traditional 53 stages of the Tōkaidō road. However, in between Fujikawa-juku and Kanbara-juku there was a traditionally unnumbered intermediary post station where a branch road led to the pilgrimage location of Mount Minobu. It was decided to build a railroad station at this location, and to bypass nearby Kambara Town instead. This led to a predictable uproar from Kambara, so Kambara Station was built a year later, but at an inconvenient distance outside of town, so as to keep the spacing between stations fairly even. A station in the center of Kambara was not actually built until Shin-Kambara Station in 1968. Iwabuchi Station was renamed "Fujikawa" in 1970.

Station numbering was introduced to the section of the Tōkaidō Line operated JR Central in March 2018; Fujikawa Station was assigned station number CA09.

Passenger statistics
In fiscal 2016, the station was used by an average of 1484 passengers daily (boarding passengers only).

Surrounding area
Fujikawa Post Office

See also
 List of Railway Stations in Japan

References

Yoshikawa, Fumio. Tokaido-sen 130-nen no ayumi. Grand-Prix Publishing (2002) .

External links

Official home page.

Railway stations in Shizuoka Prefecture
Tōkaidō Main Line
Railway stations in Japan opened in 1889
Stations of Central Japan Railway Company
Fuji, Shizuoka